Jan Poštulka (born 9 March 1949) is a Czech football coach and ex-football player.

Poštulka was a goalkeeper of the Czechoslovak teams Sparta Prague and Bohemians Prague. As a head coach, he enjoyed his greatest success in Central America (Champion of Central America, Champion of Costa Rica, Guatemala Cup Winner, LG Cup Winner) where he worked in the 1990s with the L.D.Alajuelense. As a coach, he spent some years with Sparta Prague.

Player career (goalkeeper)
1971–78 Sparta Prague 1.Czechoslovakia's league
1978–80 Inter Bratislava 1.Czechoslovakia's league
1980–83 Bohemians Prague 1.Czechoslovakia's league (80–83 attendance in UEFA Europa League)

Trainer career
1983–90        Bohemians Prague 1.Czech league  – Assistant of head coach
champion of Czech Republic
attendance in UEFA Europa League
1990–91 	Hradec Králové 1.Czech league  – Assistant of head coach
1991–93	L.D.Alajuelense 1.Costa Rican league – Head coach
champion of Costa Rica
champion of Central America and the Caribbean
finalist of CONCACAF
1996–98	Sparta Prague 1. Czech league – Assistant of head coach
2x champion of the Czech Republic
2x attendance in UEFA Champions League
1998–99	Municipal de Guatemala 1.Guatemalan league – Head coach
winner of Guatemala Cup
LG cup winner (venue Costa Rica)
2000–04	FK Teplice 1. Czech league	 –  assistant and head coach
Czech cup winner
3rd round of UEFA Cup
2005      SK Dynamo Ceské Budejovice 1.Czech league – assistant of head coach
2007      FC Banants Yerevan 1. Armenian league – Head coach
Armenian Cup winner

Other
Fair Play prize of the Czech Olympic Committee for lifetime contribution.

Trivia
His son Tomáš Poštulka is a goalkeeper, playing notably for Sparta Prague.

Sources
 Official website of Liga Deportiva Alajuelense
 Official website of Sparta Prague
 Official website of FK Teplice
 Official website of Dynamo CB

1949 births
Living people
Czech football managers
Czech footballers
Czechoslovak footballers
Association football goalkeepers
AC Sparta Prague players
FK Inter Bratislava players
FK Teplice managers
FC Urartu managers
C.S.D. Municipal managers
L.D. Alajuelense managers
Expatriate football managers in Guatemala
Expatriate football managers in Costa Rica
Expatriate football managers in Armenia
Czech expatriate sportspeople in Costa Rica
Czech expatriate sportspeople in Guatemala